The Lions Youth Brass is a youth band based in Sandbach, England.  Founded in 1989, the band is named after several Lions Clubs in the region that have sponsored it since its founding.  With over 100 members, the organisation contains three bands for players of different skill levels; in ascending order, these are the Beginner band, the Junior band, and the Youth band. The age range of the organisation ranges between 6 and 19 and rehearse at Sandbach School every Tuesday.

All three bands compete at various competitions including the National Youth Brass Band Championships. The Youth Band compete in the Championship Section where they were placed second in 2012 and 2014. The Junior Band compete in the Junior section and the Beginner Band in the Beginner section, where they picked up the "Band with Most Potential" prize in 2014,2015 and 2016.

The Youth Band have toured various locations in Europe which have included the Czech Republic, Republic of Ireland and Spain. The band have also made numerous recordings.

Players developed by Lions Youth Brass have gone on to play with famous bands such as Black Dyke Mills Band, Foden's Band and Tredegar Town Band. Over the years they have had a close relationship with the Roberts Bakery Band with many current and former players performing with the Sandbach-based band.

The organisation's current Musical Directors are Nigel Birch (Youth Band), Tom Hancock (Junior Band) and Christopher Thompson (Beginner Band). They are also assisted by tutors Matthew Darlington, Steve Barwick, Derek Gardener and Charlotte Birch.

External links

People from Sandbach
Lions Clubs International